Devegeçidi Bridge, also known as Palu Bridge, Kara Köprü and Sultan Murad IV Köprüsü is a disused stone bridge of seven arches across the Devegeçidi stream  north of Diyarbakır, in southeast Turkey, on the road to Ergani. There is a separate bridge across the same stream that is often also called the Devegeçidi Bridge  to the east, near the stream's confluence with the Tigris river.

There are three inscriptions on the southern portion of the bridge, one of which indicates that it was built in 1218 by the Artuqid ruler Melik Salih Nâsıreddin Mahmud. The bridge is made entirely of basalt blocks, some finely dressed others less so and has seven pointed arches, of which the southern two are the broadest. Deve Geçidi Bridge was last repaired in 1972.

The bridge became notorious as an execution site during the Armenian genocide; it is estimated at least 10,000 Armenians from Erzurum Vilayet were executed nearby.

Footnotes

References

Sources

Bridges completed in the 13th century
Deck arch bridges
Anatolia Beyliks bridges
Buildings and structures in Diyarbakır Province
Stone bridges in Turkey
Tourist attractions in Diyarbakır Province
Buildings and structures completed in the 13th century
Arch bridges in Turkey
Bridges in Diyarbakır